Curtis “Colt” Terry,  (February 8, 1929 - September 15, 2005) was one of the original Green Berets - one of the original instructors of Army Special Forces. He died on September 15, 2005 from pancreatic cancer.

After forging his birth certificate to enlist at 16 in 1945, Terry served two tours in combat in Korea, one behind enemy lines, and three tours in combat in Vietnam. He enlisted in the U.S. Army on September 26, 1945 as a private. He retired in August 1970 as a Lieutenant colonel and during his time in service he spent more than 23 years as a Green Beret instructor.

References

United States Army officers
1929 births
2005 deaths
United States Army personnel of the Korean War
United States Army personnel of the Vietnam War
Deaths from pancreatic cancer
People from Kissimmee, Florida